A Young Doctor's Notebook is a British dark comedy television programme based on the short story collection of the same name by Mikhail Bulgakov. Jon Hamm and Daniel Radcliffe portray the show's main characters (a doctor at the fictional Muryevo Hospital in Russia at different ages). The first series was broadcast between 6 December and 27 December 2012 on Sky Arts 1, and a second (and final) series aired from 21 November to 12 December 2013. The first series takes place in the year 1917 during the Russian Revolution, and the second series takes place in the following year during the Russian Civil War.

Production

The second series is based on the short story titled "Morphine" by Bulgakov. The title cards and credits use faux Cyrillic. The music for the programme was composed by Stephen Warbeck. It features violin, a clarinet, acoustic guitar, and cello. The theme song was featured on Sky Arts' compilation album Sky Theme Tunes, Vol. 2.

Series overview
Dr. Vladimir Bomgard leads a team at the fictional Muryevo Hospital in Russia. The team consists of Pelageya Ivanovna (Rosie Cavaliero), a junior midwife; Demyan Lukich (Adam Godley), a feldsher; and Anna Nikolayevna (Vicki Pepperdine), a senior midwife. The typical episode follows the team in their attempts to treat patients' illnesses. Bomgard contends with the uneducated populace, which refuses his treatment. He regularly provides them with rapid and accurate diagnoses.

Bomgard has a physical relationship with Pelageya. In the third episode, they have sex for the first time. In the second series, they try being a couple, and make their relationship work. In the sixth episode, Bomgard tells Pelageya he never loved her, and they separate.

A Young Doctor's Notebook is set in the fictional town of Muryevo, Korobovo in Russia. The first series takes place in the year 1917 during the Russian Revolution, and the second series takes place in the following year during the Russian Civil War. The programme also takes place in the years 1934 and 1935. The show's main character reads his old diary and recalls his experiences, interjecting himself into the story of his younger self. The doctor interacts with his younger self, having conversations that reveal aspects of the story yet to unfold.

In the second series, the Russian Civil War begins to affect the fictional Muryevo Hospital, as an influx of wounded soldiers from both the Bolsheviks and the White Guard arrive for treatment. Meanwhile, the young doctor is battling an all-encompassing morphine addiction. His older self stands watch over him, and a young aristocrat named Natasha arrives in the hospital. The young doctor takes an intense, destructive interest in Natasha. At the same time, The Feldsher takes a romantic interest in a tall, moustached Colonel of the White Guard, who is also staying in the hospital. They are both fond of each other, and share a love for pickled sprats. At one point, The Feldsher is seen bringing him a bouquet of flowers. The Colonel reciprocates.

A significant plot element is Bomgard's use of morphine to manage pain, caused by living in a remote and isolated community and abdominal pain. When he has no access to morphine, he occasionally self-medicates with cocaine. Bomgard also frequently chain smokes when he is on medical duty. In the first series finale, the young doctor reacts to mercy killing by taking morphine, and his addiction recurs. At the close of the first series finale, the young doctor begins to hallucinate.  His addiction leads to conflicts with Pelageya. In the last episode, the young doctor admits he is addicted to morphine, describing himself as a "hopeless addict". In the first series, the older doctor is under investigation for writing false prescriptions for morphine for himself, before he attempts suicide via overdose, and is subsequently incarcerated as a result. At the opening of the second series premier, the older and rehabilitated Doctor Bomgard is released from a mental institution, with his addiction under control.

The young doctor is constantly reminded of the former doctor Leopold Leopoldovich's austere presence through comments comparing them by the midwives, and the several large, foreboding portraits of Leopold sporting a huge beard on the walls of the medical practice. The young doctor often feels insecure and inadequate when faced with Leopoldovich's reputation and skills, which grows into resentful annoyance.

Cast

All five of the main actors appeared in every episode. All five play staff who work at the fictional Muryevo Hospital in Russia. Jon Hamm and Daniel Radcliffe received star billing.

 Jon Hamm as the older Dr. Vladimir "Nika" Bomgard. The older doctor fails to prevent his younger self from making the mistakes he currently regrets.
 Daniel Radcliffe as the young Dr. Vladimir "Nika" Bomgard. A graduate at the top of his class at the Moscow State University of Medicine and Dentistry, he arrives, idealistic, and with no practical experience. In the face of ignorant patients, an endless workload of hopeless cases, little support, a personal illness, and extreme isolation, the young doctor quickly degrades into apathy and despair. The young doctor struggles all the while, gradually descending from chain smoking into morphine addiction.
 Rosie Cavaliero as Pelageya Ivanovna, a junior midwife. She is brusquely kind.
 Adam Godley as Demyan Lukich, a feldsher. Trained as a field doctor, he practices as the doctor's assistant during operations. He smokes a tobacco pipe, and is fond of pickled sprats and atlases. The young doctor views Lukich as socially inappropriate and annoying, though well-intentioned.
 Vicki Pepperdine as Anna Nikolayevna, a senior midwife. She is very stern, and treats the doctor as a child because of his age and inexperience. She has a loving devotion to Leopold Leopoldovitch, the much-admired, much-accomplished previous doctor, and often compares Bomgard to him or cites his many accomplishments.

Despite the programme's short run, several recurring characters emerged:

 Christopher Godwin as Leopold Leopoldovitch, the former doctor at the hospital. He has an austere presence and high reputation and skills. He appears in hallucinations in the final two episodes of the first series. 
 Shaun Pye as Yegorych. He appears in three episodes of series one.
 Tim Steed as NKVD Agent Kirill, who investigates the older doctor on behalf of the law enforcement agency. He appears in all four episodes of series one.
 Margaret Clunie as Natasha, a beautiful young aristocrat who arrives at the clinic during the war. She appears in the final three episodes of the second series.
 Charles Edwards as The Colonel. He appears in the final three episodes of the second series.
 Tom Forbes as Anatoliy. He appears in the final three episodes of the second series.
 Daniel Cerqueira as Vlas, a morphine addict-hating vagrant travelling by train with the older doctor. He appears in all four episodes of series two.

Episodes

A half-hour behind the scenes documentary immediately followed the last episode on Sky Arts 1 on 12 December 2013.

Reception

The average viewing for the first series was 252,000 people making it the most watched programme on Sky Arts 1 at the time of its airing. It was well received by critics, and was nominated for the Magnolia Award for Best Television Film or Miniseries at the 19th Shanghai Television Festival in 2013, as well as for the Satellite Award for Best Television Series – Musical or Comedy at the 18th Satellite Awards in 2014.

Release

The first series was broadcast in the United States between 2 October and 23 October 2013 on Ovation, and a second series aired from 19 August to 9 September 2014.

See also
Morphine, 2008 Russian film based on the same Bulgakov short stories.

References

External links

 A Young Doctor's Notebook at Sky Arts. Archived from the original on 6 July 2013.
 A Young Doctor's Notebook at Sky.com. Archived from the original on 27 November 2015.
 A Young Doctor's Notebook at Sky Go
 A Young Doctor's Notebook & Other Stories at Sky Go
 A Young Doctor's Notebook: Behind The Scenes at Sky Go
 A Young Doctor's Notebook at Big Talk Productions
 A Young Doctor's Notebook at Ovation
 A Young Doctor's Notebook at BBC First
 
 

2012 British television series debuts
2013 British television series endings
2010s British drama television series
2010s British medical television series
Films based on works by Mikhail Bulgakov
Sky UK original programming
Fiction set in 1917
Fiction set in 1918
Fiction set in 1919
Fiction set in 1935
Television series set in the 1910s
Television series set in the 1930s
English-language television shows
Television shows set in Russia
Works about the Russian Revolution
Television shows about drugs
Television series by Big Talk Productions
Television series based on short fiction
Films scored by Stephen Warbeck